The Bayer designations k Velorum and K Velorum are distinct. Due to technical limitations, both designations link here. For the star
k Velorum, see HD 79940 (sometimes called k2 Velorum)
k1 Velorum, see HD 79807
K Velorum, see HD 80456

See also
κ Velorum (Kappa Velorum)

Velorum, k
Vela (constellation)